Ahore or Ahor (Aavar)   is a town in the Jalore District of the Indian state of Rajasthan. Strategically located at intersection of Sanderao-Jalore and Jalore-Jodhpur Highway and is a great commercial hub catering to almost all nearby villages and towns. Nearby Railway Stations are Jalore (18 kms), Falna (50 km) and Jodhpur (120 km) and Jodhpur has an Airport too. The Rajasthan Vidhan Sabha Constituency is Ahore itself.

Geography
It is located 18 km east of Jalore on NH 325 between Jalore and Sanderao. It is the headquarters of the tehsil of the same name.

This town can be found at the intersection that connects Jalore, the District Headquarters, and Jodhpur, a major city.

The Ahor tehsil has 41 Gram Panchayats. The Gram Panchayats are: Agawari, Ahore, Aipura, Ajeetpura, [[Bala, Ahor]], Bankli, Badanwari, Bavadi, Bhadrajun, Bhawrani, Bhanswara, Bhooti, Bhorda, Bithuda, Chandra, Charali, Chavarcha, Chunda, Dayalpura, Dodiyali, Ghana, Guda Balotan, Harji, Kamdba, Kanwla, Kavarada, Nimbla, Norwa, Nosra, Padarali, Panchota, Paota, Raithal, Rama, Rodla, Sankarna, Sedria, Shankhwali, Sugalia Jodha, Thanwala, Umedpur, Valadara and Vediya.

Demographics 
The population of Ahor is 16,873 according to a census in 2011. The male population is 8,602, while the female population is 8,272.

Culture

Jainism 
The city is the birthplace of Indian Jain scholar Muni Jayanandvijay. The centre of Jain books and literature, known as Gyan-Bhandar, was established there by Jain Acharya Rajendrasuri. The town has eight Jain temples, one of which was Godi Parshvanath Jain Mandir, which had its pratishtha done under the guidance of Shri Acharya Rajendrasuri Maharaaj.

The temple of Shree Vimal Nath Swami is in the center of Ahor. Shree Kalyan Vijajji Mahajsaheb created the pratishtha of this temple. A temple of Srimad Rajchandra of Agasashram is there. One of grand temple of Lord Paras Nath called Parshwdi. Vimal Nath Ji is one of the historical temples in Ahor and recently the pratishtha of a beautiful marble statue of Sri Kalyan Vijayji Maharaj, a Jain saint was built in this temple. Shantinathji is the oldest temple in Ahor and one of its kind in India. it is considered one of the tirth for the Jain community.

Bhata Gair
Ahor was famous for Bhata Gair, a ceremony which, until 2004, took place during the festival of Holi. As a rule, only those born in Ahor were allowed to participate. In this ritual, people were divided into two teams, one that consumed alcohol and the other that did not, and they were separated with a fence in between. The aim was to cross the fence, and the team who crossed the fence wins. When one player attempted to cross the fence, the members of the other team would throw stones and attack the player who the player which was crossing the fence with bamboo sticks. The ceremony was ended by the administration due to its dangerous nature.

Chamunda Mata Mandir
Locals believe that a statue of Chamunda Mata (Hindu Goddess) appeared from an old pond called Daki nada (Evil Pond) when a potter was digging for clay in the pond. That Chunda / Chamunda Mata statue was put in the mandir now known as Chamunda Mata Mandir.

Sureshawar Mandir 
The famous Sureshawar Mandir (Lord Shiva Temple) can be found on Aesrana Hill. The temple is about 10 km away from Ahor and is near Pandgara Village.

Karni Mata Temple 
The famous temple of Karni Mata at Sanwara is 2 km from Ahor.

Momoji Mandir
The famous temple of Momoji mandir at sutharo ki gali

Economy
Ahor is known for Suthar's steel handicraft and grill, railing and steel gate designs dedicated to temples. An estimated 35 steel handicraft workshops operate in Ahor. Their steel handicrafts can be seen across India. Ahor is also famous for its beautiful Mojari (a type of footwear) made of leather.

External links
 Ahor Thikana

References 

Cities and towns in Jalore district